William Gilmore may refer to:
 William Gilmore (rower) (1895–1969), American rower
 William H. Gilmore (1839–1910), Vermont political and military figure
 William J. Gilmore (1821–1896), American jurist in Ohio
 William S. Gilmore, American producer of Defiance (1980 film)